Marco Antônio de Oliveira Coelho (born 15 July 2000), commonly known as Marco Antônio, is a Brazilian footballer who plays for Goiás as a midfielder.

Career statistics

Club

References

2000 births
Living people
Brazilian footballers
Brazil youth international footballers
Association football midfielders
Campeonato Brasileiro Série A players
Campeonato Brasileiro Série B players
Cruzeiro Esporte Clube players
Goiás Esporte Clube players
Footballers from Belo Horizonte